Leibl is a German surname. Notable people with the surname include:

Carl Leibl (1784–1870), German musician and conductor
Tammy Leibl (born 1965), American volleyball and beach volleyball player
Wilhelm Leibl (1844–1900), German painter

German-language surnames